Apple Orchard Mountain is a peak of the Blue Ridge Mountains in Virginia.

Located in George Washington and Jefferson National Forests, Apple Orchard Mountain is the county highpoint for both Bedford County and Botetourt County, Virginia as well as the highest point on the Blue Ridge Parkway in Virginia. It is also the most topographically prominent mountain in the state. The summit is open, and an FAA radar stands nearby. This radar stand makes the mountain recognizable from miles away.

References

Landforms of Bedford County, Virginia
Blue Ridge Mountains
Landforms of Botetourt County, Virginia
Mountains of Virginia
Mountains on the Appalachian Trail